Michael Kirk Douglas (born September 25, 1944) is an American actor and film producer. He has received numerous accolades, including two Academy Awards, five Golden Globe Awards, a Primetime Emmy Award, the Cecil B. DeMille Award, and the AFI Life Achievement Award.

The elder son of Kirk Douglas and Diana Dill, Douglas received his Bachelor of Arts in drama from the University of California, Santa Barbara. His early acting roles included film, stage, and television productions. Douglas first achieved prominence for his performance in the ABC police procedural television series The Streets of San Francisco, for which he received three consecutive Emmy Award nominations. In 1975, Douglas produced One Flew Over the Cuckoo's Nest, having acquired the rights to the Ken Kesey novel from his father. The film received critical and popular acclaim, and won the Academy Award for Best Picture, earning Douglas his first Oscar as one of the film's producers.

Douglas went on to produce films including The China Syndrome (1979) and Romancing the Stone (1984), for which he received the Golden Globe Award for Best Motion Picture – Musical or Comedy, and The Jewel of the Nile (1985).
Douglas received critical acclaim for his portrayal of Gordon Gekko in Oliver Stone's Wall Street (1987), for which he won the Academy Award for Best Actor (a role he reprised in the sequel Wall Street: Money Never Sleeps in 2010).
Other notable roles include in A Chorus Line (1985), Fatal Attraction (1987), The War of the Roses (1989), Basic Instinct (1992), Falling Down (1993), The American President (1995), The Game (1997), Traffic (2000), Wonder Boys (2000), Solitary Man (2009). 

In 2013, for his portrayal of Liberace in the HBO film Behind the Candelabra, he won the Primetime Emmy Award for Outstanding Lead Actor in a Miniseries or a Movie. Douglas starred as an aging acting coach in the Netflix comedy series The Kominsky Method (2018–2021), for which he won a Golden Globe Award for Best Actor – Television Series Musical or Comedy. He has portrayed Hank Pym in the Marvel Cinematic Universe, appearing in the films Ant-Man (2015), Ant-Man and the Wasp (2018), Avengers: Endgame (2019), and Ant-Man and the Wasp: Quantumania (2023). He also voiced an alternate version of the character in the MCU animated television series What If...?.

Douglas has received notice for his humanitarian and political activism. He sits on the board of the Nuclear Threat Initiative, is an honorary board member of the anti-war grant-making foundation Ploughshares Fund and he was appointed as a United Nations Messenger of Peace in 1998. He has been married to actress Catherine Zeta-Jones since 2000.

Early life and education 
Douglas was born in New Brunswick, New Jersey, the first child of actors Kirk Douglas (1916–2020) and Diana Dill (1923–2015). His parents met at the American Academy of Dramatic Arts.

His father was Jewish and was born Issur Danielovitch. Michael's paternal grandparents were emigrants from Chavusy in the Russian Empire (present-day Belarus). His mother was from Devonshire Parish, Bermuda, and had English, Irish, Scottish, Welsh, French, Belgian, and Dutch ancestry. Douglas's uncle was politician Sir Nicholas Bayard Dill, and Douglas's maternal grandfather, Lieutenant-Colonel Thomas Melville Dill, served as Attorney General of Bermuda, as a Member of the Parliament of Bermuda (MCP), and as commanding officer of the Bermuda Militia Artillery.

His great-grandfather, Thomas Newbold Dill (1837–1910), was a merchant, an MCP for Devonshire Parish from 1868 to 1888, a member of the legislative council and an assistant justice from 1888, mayor of the City of Hamilton from 1891 to 1897, served on numerous committees and boards, and was a member of the Devonshire Church (Church of England) and Devonshire Parish vestries. Thomas Newbold Dill's father, another Thomas Melville Dill, was a sea captain who took the Bermudian-built barque Sir George F. Seymour from Bermuda to Ireland in thirteen days in March 1858, but lost his master's certificate after the wreck of the Bermudian-built Cedrine on the Isle of Wight while returning the last convict labourers from the Royal Naval Dockyard in Bermuda to Britain in 1863. The current (installed on 29 May 2013) Bishop of Bermuda, the Right Reverend Nicholas Dill, is a cousin of Michael Douglas.

Douglas has a younger brother, Joel Douglas (born 1947), and two paternal half-brothers, Peter Douglas (born 1955) and Eric Douglas (1958–2004), from stepmother Anne Buydens.

Douglas attended The Allen-Stevenson School in New York City, Eaglebrook School in Deerfield, Massachusetts, and The Choate Preparatory School (now Choate Rosemary Hall) in Wallingford, Connecticut. He received his B.A. in dramatic art from the University of California, Santa Barbara in 1968, where he was also the honorary president of the UCSB Alumni Association. He studied acting with Wynn Handman at The American Place Theatre in New York City.

Career

Early years 

His first TV breakthrough role came with a 1969 CBS Playhouse special, The Experiment—and it was the only time he was billed as "M.K. Douglas". On November 24, 1969, Douglas formed his first independent film production company, Bigstick Productions, Limited. Michael Douglas started his film career in the late 1960s and early 1970s, appearing in little known films such as Hail, Hero!, Adam at 6 A.M., and Summertree. His performance in Hail, Hero! earned him a nomination for the Golden Globe Award for Most Promising Male Newcomer.

His first significant role came in the TV series The Streets of San Francisco from 1972 to 1976, in which he starred alongside Karl Malden. Douglas later said that Malden became a "mentor" and someone he "admired and loved deeply". After Douglas left the show, he had a long association with his mentor until Malden's death on July 1, 2009. In 2004, Douglas presented Malden with the Monte Cristo Award of the Eugene O'Neill Theater Center in Waterford, Connecticut for the Lifetime Achievement Award.

In late 1971, Douglas received from his father, Kirk Douglas, the rights to the novel One Flew Over the Cuckoo's Nest, which had been purchased by Bryna Productions in February 1962. Michael went on to produce the film of the same name with Saul Zaentz. Kirk Douglas hoped to portray McMurphy himself, having starred in an earlier stage version, but was deemed too old for the part by his son Michael. Kirk relented, and the lead role went instead to Jack Nicholson, who won the Academy Award for Best Actor. Douglas won the Award for Best Picture for producing the film. In December 1976, Michael and his brother Peter became head of their father's film production company, The Bryna Company, though Michael would depart by 1978 to focus exclusively on producing through his own Bigstick Productions.

After leaving The Streets of San Francisco in 1976, Douglas played a hospital doctor in the medical thriller Coma (1978), and in 1979 he played the role of a troubled marathon runner in Running. In 1979, he both produced and starred in The China Syndrome, a dramatic film co-starring Jane Fonda and Jack Lemmon about a nuclear power plant accident (the Three Mile Island accident took place 12 days after the film's release). The film was considered "one of the most intelligent Hollywood films of the 1970s". In June 1979, Michael appointed Jack Brodsky Executive Vice-president of Bigstick Productions.

Success in Hollywood 
Douglas's acting career was propelled to fame when he produced and starred in the 1984 romantic adventure comedy Romancing the Stone. It also reintroduced Douglas as a capable leading man and gave director Robert Zemeckis his first box-office success. The film also starred Danny DeVito, a friend of Douglas since they had shared an apartment in the 1960s. It was followed a year later by a sequel, The Jewel of the Nile, which he also produced. Bigstick Productions was then partnered with Mercury Entertainment, a company backed by producer Michael Phillips in 1986 to produce independently financed features. In the 1980s, Douglas formed a new film production company, The Stone Group (later renamed Stonebridge Entertainment) with partner Rick Bieber.

The year 1987 saw Douglas star in the thriller Fatal Attraction with Glenn Close. That same year he played tycoon Gordon Gekko in Oliver Stone's Wall Street for which he received an Academy Award as Best Actor. He reprised his role as Gekko in the sequel Wall Street: Money Never Sleeps in 2010, also directed by Stone.

Douglas starred in the 1989 film The War of the Roses, which also starred Kathleen Turner and Danny DeVito. In 1989 he starred in Ridley Scott's international police crime drama Black Rain opposite Andy García and Kate Capshaw; the film was shot in Osaka, Japan.

In 1992, Douglas had another successful starring role when he appeared alongside Sharon Stone in the film Basic Instinct. The movie was a box office hit, and sparked controversy over its depictions of bisexuality and lesbianism. In March 1994, Douglas announced that he had formed a new film production company, Douglas/Reuther Productions, in partnership with Steven Reuther. In 1994 Douglas and Demi Moore starred in the hit movie Disclosure focusing on the topic of sexual harassment with Douglas playing a man harassed by his new female boss. Other popular films he starred in during the decade were Falling Down, The American President, The Ghost and the Darkness, The Game (directed by David Fincher), and a remake of Alfred Hitchcock's classic – Dial M for Murder – titled A Perfect Murder. In 1998 Douglas received the Crystal Globe award for outstanding artistic contribution to world cinema at the Karlovy Vary International Film Festival. On November 19, 1997, Douglas formed his fourth film production company, Further Films. 

In 2000, Douglas starred in Steven Soderbergh's critically acclaimed film Traffic, opposite Benicio del Toro and future wife, Catherine Zeta-Jones. That same year he also received critical acclaim for his role in Wonder Boys, as a professor and novelist suffering from writer's block. He was nominated for a Golden Globe Award for Best Actor in a Drama and for the BAFTA Award for Best Actor in a Leading Role.

2001–present

Douglas starred in Don't Say a Word (2001), filmed shortly before his marriage to Zeta-Jones. In 2003, he starred in It Runs in the Family, which featured three generations of his family (his parents, Kirk and Diana, as well as his own son, Cameron). The film, although a labor of love, was not successful, critically or at the box office. He then starred in and produced the action-thriller The Sentinel in 2006. During that time, he also guest starred on the episode "Fagel Attraction" of the television sitcom Will & Grace as a gay cop attracted to Will Truman (Eric McCormack); the performance earned Douglas an Emmy Award nomination for Outstanding Guest Actor in a Comedy Show.

Douglas was approached for Basic Instinct 2, but he declined to participate in the project.

In December 2007, Douglas began announcing the introduction to NBC Nightly News. Howard Reig, the previous announcer, had retired two years earlier.

Douglas collaborated with Steven Soderbergh again on the 2013 film Behind the Candelabra, playing Liberace, opposite Matt Damon, centered on the pianist's life. His portrayal of Liberace received critical acclaim, which resulted in him receiving the Emmy Award for Outstanding Lead Actor in a Miniseries or a Movie at the 65th Primetime Emmy Awards. He also won SAG and Golden Globe Awards for the performance. He played Hank Pym in the films Ant-Man (2015), Ant-Man and the Wasp (2018), and Avengers: Endgame (2019), based on the Marvel Comics superhero of the same name. The Ant-Man films were directed by Peyton Reed and starred Paul Rudd. In 2018, he starred with Alan Arkin in The Kominsky Method, playing Sandy Kominsky, an aging acting coach. He received a Golden Globe Award for his performance. The same year, he starred in a Chinese film, Animal World, based on the Japanese manga series Kaiji.

Douglas is on the board of selectors of the Jefferson Awards for Public Service.

Types of roles 
According to film historian and critic David Thomson, Douglas was capable of playing characters who were "weak, culpable, morally indolent, compromised, and greedy for illicit sensation without losing that basic probity or potential for ethical character that we require of a hero". Critic and author Rob Edelman points out similarities in many of Douglas's roles, writing that in some of his leading films, he personified the "contemporary, Caucasian middle-to-upper-class American male who finds himself the brunt of female anger because of real or imagined sexual slights".

These themes of male victimization are seen in films such as Fatal Attraction (1987) with Glenn Close, The War of the Roses (1989) with Kathleen Turner, Basic Instinct (1992) with Sharon Stone, Falling Down (1993), and Disclosure (1994) with Demi Moore. For his characters in films such as these, "any kind of sexual contact with someone other than his mate and the mother of his children is destined to come at a costly price." Edelman describes his characters as the "Everyman who must contend with, and be victimized by, these women and their raging, psychotic sexuality".

Conversely, Douglas also played powerful characters with dominating personalities equally well: as Gordon Gekko, in the Wall Street franchise, he acted the role of a "greedy yuppie personification of the Me generation," convinced that "greed is good;" in Romancing the Stone and The Jewel of the Nile, he played an idealistic soldier of fortune; in The Star Chamber (1983), he was a court judge fed up with an inadequate legal system, leading him to become involved with a vigilante group; and in Black Rain (1989), he proved he could also play a Stallone-like action hero as a New York City cop.

Having become recognized as both a successful producer and actor, he describes himself as "an actor first and a producer second". He has explained why he enjoys both functions:

Personal life 

After the filming of Summertree in 1971, Douglas began dating actress Brenda Vaccaro, a relationship that lasted nearly six years.

In March 1977, Douglas married Diandra Luker, the daughter of an Austrian diplomat. At the time, Douglas was 32 and Luker was 19. <ref name="33&19">[http://www.people.com/people/archive/article/0,,20101047,00.html People Magazine] . People.com (July 10, 1995). Retrieved on May 4, 2012.</ref> They had one son, Cameron, born in 1978. In 1995, Diandra filed for divorce and was awarded $45 million as part of the divorce settlement.10 Most Expensive Celebrity Divorces, Forbers.com, 12 April 2007. Forbes.com (May 22, 2002). Retrieved on May 4, 2012.

In March 1999, Douglas began dating Welsh actress Catherine Zeta-Jones. The pair married on November 18, 2000. They were both born on September 25, albeit 25 years apart. Zeta-Jones says that when they met in Deauville, France, Douglas said, "I want to father your children." They have two children, son Dylan Michael (born August 8, 2000) and daughter Carys Zeta (born April 20, 2003). The family has a coastal estate near Valldemossa, Mallorca.

In August 2013, People claimed that Douglas and Zeta-Jones began living separately in May 2013, but did not take any legal action towards separation or divorce. A representative for Zeta-Jones subsequently confirmed that they "are taking some time apart to evaluate and work on their marriage". It was reported on November 1, 2013, that the couple had reconciled and Zeta-Jones moved back into their New York apartment.

Douglas was born to a Jewish father and an Anglican (Church of England) mother. His cousin, the Right Reverend Nicholas Dill, is the bishop of the established Anglican Church of Bermuda. Douglas was not raised with a religious affiliation, but stated in January 2015, that he now identifies as a Reform Jew. His son, Dylan, had a Bar Mitzvah ceremony, and the Douglas family traveled to Jerusalem to mark the occasion.

Douglas was the recipient of the 2015 Genesis Prize, a $1 million prize awarded by the Genesis Prize Foundation for Jewish achievement. He donated the prize money to activities designed to raise awareness about inclusion and diversity in Jewish life, and to finding innovative solutions to pressing global and community problems. Douglas is a U.S. citizen by birth in the United States and has British citizenship with Bermudian Status through his mother's birth in Bermuda.

Allegations of sexual misconduct

In 2018, journalist and author Susan Braudy alleged on the U.S. TV program Today and in several interviews that, while Braudy was in her 40s and working for Douglas in 1989, Douglas regularly made degrading sexual comments about or to her. She stated this caused her to wear baggy clothing at work, and also recalled a one-on-one script meeting where Douglas allegedly undid his pants and fondled himself with her in the room. 

In a pre-emptive statement, Douglas admitted to using coarse language but categorically denied any other wrongdoing. Zeta-Jones, asked about the allegations while promoting Cocaine Godmother, did not address them directly but said that her husband was "110 percent behind" the #MeToo movement and that she was "very, very happy" with his statement.

In the media

In 1980, Douglas was involved in a serious skiing accident which sidelined his acting career for three years. On September 17, 1992, the same year Basic Instinct came out, he began a 30-day treatment for alcoholism and drug addiction at Sierra Tucson Center.He went to rehab in the 1990s for what he said was an alcohol problem, but was widely reported to be sex addiction. Mirror, August 8, 2013

In 1992, Douglas founded the short-lived Atlantic Records distributed label Third Stone Records. He founded the label with record producer Richard Rudolph, who became the company's president and CEO. Among the acts signed to Third Stone were Saigon Kick and Nona Gaye.

In 1997, New York caddie James Parker sued Douglas for $25 million. Parker accused Douglas of hitting him in the groin with an errant golf ball, causing Parker great distress. The case was later settled out of court.

In 2004, Douglas and Zeta-Jones took legal action against stalker Dawnette Knight, who was accused of sending violent letters to the couple that contained graphic threats on Zeta-Jones's life. Testifying, Zeta-Jones said the threats left her so shaken she feared a nervous breakdown. Knight claimed she was in love with Douglas and admitted to the offenses, which took place between October 2003 and May 2004. She was sentenced to three years in prison.

Health
It was announced on August 16, 2010, that Douglas was suffering from throat cancer (later revealed to have actually been tongue cancer), and would undergo chemotherapy and radiation treatment. He subsequently confirmed that the cancer was at stage IV, an advanced stage.

Douglas credits the discovery of his cancer to the public Canadian health system since a doctor in Montreal, Quebec diagnosed the actor's medical condition after numerous American specialists failed to do so.Michael Douglas praises Canadian health care. Gobeandmail.com (May 3, 2011). Retrieved June 19, 2012. Douglas has since participated in fundraisers for Montreal's Jewish General Hospital, where he was diagnosed, and the McGill University Health Centre with which the hospital is affiliated.

Douglas attributed the cancer to stress, his previous alcohol abuse, and years of heavy smoking. In July 2011, Star magazine published photographs which appeared to show him smoking a cigarette while on holiday that month. A representative declined to comment on the photographs.

In November 2010, Douglas's doctors put him on a weight-gain diet due to excessive weight loss that left him weak. On January 11, 2011, he said that the tumor was gone, though the illness and aggressive treatment had caused him to lose 32 pounds (14.5 kg). He said he would require monthly screenings because of a high chance of recurrence within three years. In June 2013, Douglas told The Guardian that his type of cancer is caused by the human papilloma virus transmitted by cunnilingus, leading some media to report this as well. His spokesman denied these reports and portrayed Douglas's conversation with The Guardian as general and not referring specifically to his own diagnosis.

Although Douglas described the cancer as throat cancer, it was publicly speculated that he may actually have been diagnosed with oropharyngeal cancer."Doctors believe Douglas has oropharyngeal cancer, not throat cancer". Newsoxy.com. Retrieved May 4, 2012. In October 2013, Douglas said he suffered from tongue cancer, not throat cancer. He announced it as throat cancer upon the advice of his physician, who felt it would be unwise to reveal that he had tongue cancer given its negative prognosis and potential for disfigurement, particularly because the announcement came immediately before Douglas's promotional tour for Wall Street: Money Never Sleeps.

 Activism 
 Political activities 

Douglas and Zeta-Jones hosted the annual Nobel Peace Prize concert in Oslo, Norway, on December 11, 2003. They acted as co-masters of ceremony in the concert celebrating the award given to Iranian human rights activist Shirin Ebadi. In 2006, Douglas was awarded an honorary Doctor of Letters (D.Litt.) from the University of St. Andrews in Scotland.

He is an advocate of nuclear disarmament, a supporter of the Nuclear Age Peace Foundation, sits on the board of the Nuclear Threat Initiative, and is an honorary board member of the anti-war grant-making foundation Ploughshares Fund. In 1998, he was appointed UN Messenger of Peace by Secretary-General Kofi Annan. He is a notable Democrat and has donated money to Barack Obama, Christopher Dodd, and Al Franken. He has been a major supporter of gun control since John Lennon was murdered in 1980.

In 2006, he was a featured speaker in a public service campaign sponsored by a UN conference to focus attention on trade of illicit arms, especially of small arms and light weapons. Douglas made several appearances and offered his opinions:

A few years earlier, in 2003, Douglas hosted a "powerful film" on child soldiers and the impact of combat on children in countries such as Sierra Leone. During the documentary film, Douglas interviewed children, and estimated that they were among 300,000 other children worldwide who have been conscripted or kidnapped and forced to fight. Of one such child he interviewed, Douglas stated, "After being kidnapped by a rebel group, he was tortured, drugged, and forced to commit atrocities."
Douglas discussed his role as a Messenger Peace for the UN:

In February 2012, following his return to the character of financial criminal Gordon Gekko, the Federal Bureau of Investigation released a public service announcement video of Douglas calling on viewers to report financial crime. In August 2014, Douglas was one of 200 public figures who were signatories to a letter to The Guardian opposing Scottish independence in the run-up to September's referendum on that issue.

In June 2015, during a visit in Israel to receive the Genesis Prize, Douglas said the boycott movement against that country is an "ugly cancer".

 Humanitarian initiatives 
In 2009, Douglas joined the project Soldiers of Peace'', a movie against all wars and for global peace.

Douglas lent his support for the campaign to release Sakineh Mohammadi Ashtiani, the Iranian woman, who after having been convicted of committing adultery, was given a sentence of death by stoning.

Acting credits and awards

See also
 List of actors with Academy Award nominations
 List of actors with Hollywood Walk of Fame motion picture stars

References

Further reading

External links 

 
 
 
 

 
1944 births
Living people
20th-century American male actors
21st-century American male actors
AFI Life Achievement Award recipients
American anti–nuclear weapons activists
American film producers
American gun control activists
American humanitarians
American male film actors
American male television actors
American people of Belarusian-Jewish descent
American people of Belgian descent
American people of Bermudian descent
American people of Dutch descent
American people of English descent
American people of French descent
American people of Irish descent
American people of Scottish descent
American people of Welsh descent
American Reform Jews
Best Actor Academy Award winners
Best Drama Actor Golden Globe (film) winners
Best Miniseries or Television Movie Actor Golden Globe winners
Best Musical or Comedy Actor Golden Globe (television) winners
Bryna Productions people
Cecil B. DeMille Award Golden Globe winners
César Honorary Award recipients
Chevaliers of the Ordre des Arts et des Lettres
Choate Rosemary Hall alumni
David di Donatello winners
Dill family
Douglas family
Film producers from New Jersey
Filmmakers who won the Best Film BAFTA Award
Golden Globe Award-winning producers
Male actors from New Jersey
New Jersey Democrats
New Jersey Hall of Fame inductees
Outstanding Performance by a Cast in a Motion Picture Screen Actors Guild Award winners
Outstanding Performance by a Lead Actor in a Miniseries or Movie Primetime Emmy Award winners
Outstanding Performance by a Male Actor in a Miniseries or Television Movie Screen Actors Guild Award winners
People from New Brunswick, New Jersey
Producers who won the Best Picture Academy Award
United Nations Messengers of Peace
University of California, Santa Barbara alumni